

Senatorial by Election

A by election for Senator took place on February 26, 2003.

Results
Candidates (1 elected)
Ted Vibert 3983
Alastair Layzell 3712
Ian MacFirbhisigh 2487
Geno Gouveia 1761
Harry Cole 489

Psephological Information
Electorate: 47825
Total Poll: 12432
Spoilt Papers: 139
% Poll: 29.31%

References
 2003 Senatorial By Election Results:Retrieved 28 July 2007

By 2003
2003 in Jersey